Zheleznodorozhnaya is a railway station of the Gorkovsky direction of the Moscow Railway of the Russian Railways. The station placed in Zheleznodorozhny microdistrict (former Zheleznodorozhny city) of Balashikha, Moscow region, Russia.

History 
The station was founded in 1861 and was named Obiralovka (former name of Zheleznodorozhny).

In 1939 as a result of petition of villagers the station was renamed to Zheleznodorozhnaya.

Description 
The station has station building with turnstiles and cash desks.

Zheleznodorozhnaya has five high platforms — 1 side and 4 island. Two bridges place over platforms: one bridge connect all platforms between each other, another bridge connects two parts of city over railway tracks (without exiting to platforms).

The station has several industrial spurs, going from western side of the station.

In 2023 will include to the D4 of the Moscow Central Diameters as a terminal station of Gorkovsky radius.

Depot 
The station has motive power depot "Zheleznodorozhnaya".

Traffic

Suburban 
Zheleznodorozhnaya is a stop station for all suburban trains which going through the station.

For some suburban trains (including expresses Moscow — Zheleznodorozhnaya called the "Sputnik") the station is terminal.

Inter-city 
All Lastochkas Moscow-Nizhny Novgorod stops on the station.

Other inter-city trains goes through the station without stopping.

In culture 
The station then called Obiralovka mentioned as a place of suicide of Anna Karenina in eponymous novel of L. Tolstoy.

The station was mentioned in Moscow-Petushki prose poem of Venedikt Yerofeyev.

Gallery

References

External links 
 Timetable of the station on tutu.ru
 Timetable of the station on Yandex.ru

Railway stations in Moscow Oblast
Railway stations of Moscow Railway